KG Steel Co., Ltd. is a South Korean multinational corporation that produces steel-related and cold-rolled products.

History
In 2013, the Korea Development Bank attempted to restructure the Dongbu Group, but its attempts resulting in slumping business. Dongbu Steel reached an agreement with creditors to undergo a debt workout program. Creditors tried to support Dongbu Steel with a variety of measures such as 600 billion won in support. The creditors then attempted to sell Dongbu Steel, but had trouble finding bidders. Dongbu Steel then sold off an electric furnace used for steel production. In May 2016, Dongbu Steel was taken off sale. In 2019, the company was acquired by a consortium led by KG Group companies and Cactus Private Equity.

See also
 SsangYong Motor

References

External links
 

Steel companies of South Korea
Companies listed on the Korea Exchange